"Dirt Sledding" is a song by American rock band The Killers, featuring actor Richard Dreyfuss and the return of Ryan Pardey as Santa. It was released on November 27, 2015. The song is the third and final chapter in a trilogy storyline involving a grudge-holding Santa Claus, following tracks "Don't Shoot Me Santa" (2007) and "I Feel It in My Bones" (2012). The song marks the tenth consecutive year in which the band has released a Christmas song. As with their previous Christmas releases, all proceeds from this song go to AIDS charities as part of the Product Red campaign. 

The song was named one of the best new holidays songs of the 2010s by Rolling Stone.

Music video
The video for "Dirt Sledding" was directed and co-produced by actor and director Matthew Gray Gubler, who is also a native of Las Vegas and directed the first video in the Santa Claus trilogy, "Don't Shoot Me Santa". The video features a reprisal of Santa Claus played by Pardey, as well as a spoken word section by Dreyfuss.

The car used in the video is a Guards Red 1983 Porsche 944 which pays reference to the same exact one used in the 1984 John Hughes film Sixteen Candles (as heard in the lyrics).

Track listing
Digital Download
 "Dirt Sledding" – 4:27

References

2015 singles
2015 songs
American Christmas songs
Black comedy music
Christmas charity singles
Island Records singles
The Killers songs
Songs about Santa Claus
Songs written by Brandon Flowers
Songs written by Dave Keuning
Songs written by Mark Stoermer
Songs written by Ronnie Vannucci Jr.